Mónica Ojeda Franco (born Guayaquil, 1988) is an Ecuadorian writer. She obtained her bachelor's degree from the Universidad Católica de Santiago de Guayaquil, followed by a master's degree from the Universidad Pompeu Fabra de Barcelona. She is currently working on her doctorate in Madrid. Ojeda has published in several genres, including poetry, novels, and short stories. In 2017, she was named as one of the Bogota39, a selection of the best young writers in Latin America. The other 38 included Samanta Schweblin, the Brazilians Mariana Torres and Gabriela Jauregui, Liliana Colanzi from Bolivia and Argentinians María José Caro and Lola Copacabana.

In January 2018 she published the novel Jawbone, which tells the story of a teenage girl obsessed with horror stories and creepypastas who is kidnapped by her literature teacher. The book was described as "one of the novels of the season" by the Spanish newspaper El País, which ranked it 12th in its list of the 50 best books of 2018. The novel was also selected as one of the ten finalists for the Mario Vargas Llosa Biennial Novel Prize in its 2018 edition.

In 2020 she was selected as one of the five finalists for the sixth edition of the Ribera del Duero Short Story Award with her unpublished book of short stories El mundo de arriba y el mundo de abajo, in which she explores through horror themes such as gender violence, abortion, sexuality and religion in a style she defined as "Andean Gothic".

Works

Novels 
 La desfiguración Silva (2015)
 Nefando (2016). Translated in 2023 as Nefando by Sarah Booker.
 Mandíbula (2018). Translated in 2022 as Jawbone by Sarah Booker.

Poetry 
 El ciclo de las piedras (2015)
 Historia de la leche (2019)

Short stories 
 Caninos (2017), individual story
 Las voladoras (2020)

References

21st-century Ecuadorian women writers
Living people
1988 births
Universidad Católica de Santiago de Guayaquil alumni
Pompeu Fabra University alumni
Ecuadorian women novelists
Ecuadorian women poets
21st-century Ecuadorian poets
Ecuadorian novelists
21st-century novelists
Ecuadorian short story writers
Ecuadorian women short story writers
21st-century short story writers
People from Guayaquil